Rosalie Chichester (November 29, 1865 – 1949) was a British landowner, writer, photographer, artist and collector. She bequeathed all of her property to the National Trust.

Biography
Rosalie Caroline Chichester was born in Arlington Court in Devon on 29 November 1865. She was the daughter of Sir Alexander Palmer Bruce Chichester and Rosalie Amelia Chamberlayne. Her paternal grandfather Sir John Chichester was the MP for Barnstaple in 1831. Chichester was educated at home by a governess and was trained in etiquette and genealogy. Chichester was presented as a debutante in 1885. Despite this and her sizable estate, Chichester never married. She gave her time and support to the local charities and events and held positions in a number of local clubs. Though her father died when she was sixteen, leaving the family in serious debt, Chichester managed to keep the estate debt free though it took from 1881 until 1928 to do so.

Chichester was a member of the Primrose League from 1885 to 1890. She was also involved with botany and photography. She took and processed photos of the tenants of the estate and won awards for her photography. She was also a competent artist and has left a number of pieces which are on display in her home. A supporter of wildlife, Chichester's land was a sanctuary against hunting and shooting. From her travels, Chichester wrote articles for the North Devon Journal and the Daily Sketch. Chichester's paid companion from 1912 until World War II was a Miss Chrissie Peters. The First World War saw Chichester on the Devon War Agricultural Appeal Tribunal as well as supporting the Women's Land Army. Chichester joined the suffrage movement in 1913 but was opposed to violent actions.

Chichester believed in the National Trust and gave Morte Point, Devon to them by 1911. She left the intact Arlington Court estate to the trust when she died on 17 January 1949 in Parade House, Woolacombe, Devon.

References

External links

1865 births
1949 deaths
19th-century English women artists
20th-century English women artists
British debutantes
Daughters of baronets
English suffragists
National Trust people
People from North Devon (district)